13 Roses is a 2007 Spanish-Italian film directed by Emilio Martínez Lázaro. It stars Pilar Lopez de Ayala, Verónica Sánchez and Marta Etura. The plot, based on a true story, follows the tragic fate of Las Trece Rosas, fighting for their ideals in the aftermath of the Spanish Civil War.

Plot
In Madrid in 1939 during the final days of the Spanish Civil War, Virtudes and Carmen, two young idealistic Republican militants, are encouraging their neighbours to keep faith in the cause of the Second Republic. However, the entry of Franco's Nationalist troops into the city is eminent. Fearing the bloody repression that was coming, many Republicans are fleeing the country while others are unable or unwilling to do so.

Julia, a streetcar attendant, and her friend Adelina, a Red Cross worker, are also active sympathizers of the Spanish Republic. While spending an evening in a nightclub watching musicians perform, one of the last bombings of the city takes place. In those dire circumstances they befriend Blanca, whose husband Enrique is the musicians' band leader.

The triumph of the Nationalist troops marks a dark turning point in the lives of those who sympathized with the Republic. Canepa, one of the musicians in Enrique's band, is a Republican militant. Fearing for his life, he decides to leave the country. Blanca, Enrique's wife, gives him some money to help him on his way. Meanwhile, Julia strikes up a relationship with dapper young nationalist soldier Perico.

It is rumoured that there was a plot to assassinate Franco on his victorious entry into the capital, and the nationalists are seeking revenge. Although the girls have nothing to do with it, they have been targeted for their propagandistic leftist activities. The first to be arrested is Julia, who, before too long, is being sadistically tortured by the orders of Fontenla, the cold-hearted officer in charge of the interrogations. Adelina, Virtudes' co-worker, like most of the others is a member of a socialist group. She is turned in by her well-meaning father in the naïve belief that nothing serious will happen to her and that she is just wanted for questioning.

Canepa and Teo are turned in by friends and neighbours and are tortured. Canepa commits suicide while under arrest. Teo has better luck and is eventually released on the condition that he has to secretly help to identify and capture his friends, sympathisers of the Republic. With Teo's help, one by one the girls are arrested, and soon they have all been jailed. Only Carmen, the youngest of the girls of the group, realises Teo's double-crossing, but she is also arrested. Blanca also suffers the same fate. Her crime is to have given Canepa some money. After suffering heavy police interrogations, the young group of women are eventually transferred to an overcrowded prison.

The reunion of the girls in jail serves as a consolation to their dire circumstances. At one point, they even enjoy a bit of tap-dancing. Their families, including Adelina's grief-stricken father, are hoping that they will eventually be released. Blanca is worried about her small son that she was forced to leave behind. Her admirable behaviour and her serenity while in jail made her gain the respect of the woman in charge of the prison.

However, their situation worsens when the group of women complain of the terrible sanitary condition for the children imprisoned with their mothers. As a protest they jointly refused to sing the praises of the Franco regime. The fate of the 13 young women is sealed when two military officers and an innocent woman are killed in cold blood by a group of leftist militants. As a punishment, the regime orders the execution of some of the prisoners, though they have nothing to do with what has happened while they are in jail. A military court condemns the 48 men and 13 women to death in less than 48 hours.

Carmen, the youngest of all, is the only survivor of the group. Desolated, she listens to the shots that killed her terrified friends.

The final frame of the film asserts that the bulk of the content is verifiable from documentation and that the script relies heavily on actual dialogue or writings from the central characters.

Cast

Production 
The film is Spanish-Italian co-production by Enrique Cerezo PC, Pedro Costa PC and Filmexport Group.

Reception
13 Roses opened on 19 October 2007.

The film had a limited release in the US in New York City. The review in Variety praised the cinematography and art direction, but remarked: "The 13 Roses largely withers on the vine. [The film] is further let down by its psychological superficiality… an uncertain treatment which convinces neither historically nor dramatically".

Accolades

|-
| rowspan = "18" align = "center" | 2008 || rowspan = "14" | 22nd Goya Awards || colspan = "2" | Best Film ||  || rowspan = "14" | 
|-
| Best Director || Emilio Martínez Lázaro || 
|-
| Best Original Screenplay || Ignacio Martínez de Pisón || 
|-
| Best Supporting Actor || José Manuel Cervino || 
|-
| Best New Actress || Nadia de Santiago ||  
|-
| Best Original Score || Roque Baños || 
|-
| Best Production Supervision || Martín Cabañas || 
|-
| Best Cinematography || José Luis Alcaine || 
|-
| Best Editing || Fernando Pardo || 
|-
| Best Art Direction || Edou Hydallgo || 
|-
| Best Costume Design || Lena Mossum || 
|-
| Best Makeup and Hairstyles || Almudena Fonseca, José Juez, Mariló Osuna || 
|-
| Best Sound || Alfonso Pino, Carlos Bonmatí, Carlos Faruolo || 
|-
| Best || Carlos Lozano, Pau Costa, Raúl Romanillos || 
|-
| rowspan = "4" | 17th Actors and Actresses Union Awards || Best Film Actress in a Secondary Role || Marta Etura ||  || rowspan = "4" | 
|-
| rowspan = "2" | Best Film Actress in a Minor Role || Nadia de Santiago || 
|-
| María Isasi || 
|-
| Best Film Actor in a Minor Role || José Manuel Cervino ||  
|}

References

External links 
 

2007 films
2000s prison drama films
2000s historical drama films
2000s Spanish-language films
Spanish historical drama films
Films set in Spain
Films set in Madrid
Films set in prison
Films set in 1939
Spanish Civil War films
Films featuring a Best Supporting Actor Goya Award-winning performance
Films scored by Roque Baños
2007 drama films
2000s Spanish films
Spanish prison films
Enrique Cerezo PC films